The Merdeka MRT station is a mass rapid transit (MRT) underground station in Kuala Lumpur, Malaysia. It is one of the stations of the Klang Valley Mass Rapid Transit (KVMRT) Sungai Buloh-Kajang Line and serves as an interchange station with Plaza Rakyat LRT station for LRT Ampang and Sri Petaling lines. The station was opened on 17 July 2017 under Phase Two operations of the MRT line.

The station's name translates to "independence" in English and is taken from its location near the historic Stadium Merdeka (English: Independence Stadium), where the independence of the Federation of Malaya was declared on 31 August 1957, and the covered Stadium Negara (English: National Stadium). The station is located beneath Jalan Hang Jebat (formerly Jalan Davidson), adjacent to historical landmarks such as Stadium Negara, Stadium Merdeka, Merdeka 118 and the future 118 Mall.

Nearby stations within reach
The station is connected with the  Plaza Rakyat LRT station via a 180-metre pedestrian linkway. The linkway connects the paid areas of both stations, thus allowing commuters to transfer between the MRT Kajang Line and the LRT Ampang & Sri Petaling Line.

The station is located about 600 metres and is within walking distance of the 
Hang Tuah LRT station and  Hang Tuah monorail station.

Station Design

Station Features 

As the underground station is near the historic Stadium Merdeka where Malaysia's first Prime Minister Tunku Abdul Rahman declared the independence of the Federation of Malaya from the British Empire on 31 August 1957, the theme "independence" was chosen for the interior design for this station.

The theme is manifested through several features such as a wall at the Upper Concourse Level bearing a relief of the Rukun Negara, the Malaysian national pledge. The ceiling above the escalator leading down from the Upper Concourse Level to the Lower Concourse Level bears a motif of the arms of the 14-pointed star on the flag of Malaysia.

At the Lower Concourse Level, each pillar bears the flag and emblem of each states of Malaysia.

Station Layout

Exit and entrances 

The station can be accessed via two main entrances (Entrance A and Entrance B) located along Jalan Hang Jebat, as well as the paid-to-paid walkway from the Plaza Rakyat LRT station via Entrance C. Entrance A is located on the north side of Jalan Hang Jebat near the YWCA and Olympic Hotel while Entrance B is located on the south side near Stadium Negara and Merdeka 118. The station is located about 600 meters and is also within walking distance of the Hang Tuah LRT and monorail station connected with the Bukit Bintang City Centre (BBCC) development.

Around the station

The station is located near the Stadium Merdeka, currently being refurbished as part of the KL118 Tower project. Directly next to Entrance B of the station is Stadium Negara indoor stadium.

The 118-storey Merdeka 118 tower will be the tallest building in Malaysia and in Southeast Asia region once completed. It is currently under construction and will be integrated with the station in the future.

Bukit Bintang City Centre is also located nearby the station and is within walking distance through a linkage walkway.

Bus Services
Being in the city centre, MRT feeder buses do not operate from this station. However, it is adjacent to Pudu Sentral, a city bus station in Kuala Lumpur.

Gallery

Station

Linkway to Plaza Rakyat LRT station

See also
Plaza Rakyat LRT station
MRT Sungai Buloh-Kajang Line

References

External links
 Merdeka MRT station | MRT Website
 Klang Valley Mass Rapid Transit website

Rapid transit stations in Kuala Lumpur
Sungai Buloh-Kajang Line
Railway stations opened in 2017